The Totj (alternatively Trotj) were an indigenous Australian people of far northern Queensland.

Country
It covered York Downs, and extended south to as far as Merluna.

Alternative name
 ? Kauwala.

Citations

References

Aboriginal peoples of Queensland